Paul Vincent Severin (August 14, 1918 – April 6, 2006) was an American football player and coach. He grew up in Natrona, Pennsylvania, attended the University of North Carolina at Chapel Hill, and played college football for the North Carolina Tar Heels football team. He played at the end position for the Tar Heels and was selected as a first-team All-American in both 1939 (Associated Press) and 1940 (Associated Press, Newspaper Enterprise Association, Football Digest, and Newsweek). Severin served as the head football coach at Randolph–Macon College in Ashland, Virginia from 1950 to 1957, compiling a record of 37–26–7.

Severin died in Ashldand, on April 6, 2006, at age 87.

Head coaching record

References

1918 births
2006 deaths
American football ends
North Carolina Tar Heels football players
Randolph–Macon Yellow Jackets football coaches
People from Allegheny County, Pennsylvania
People from Ashland, Virginia
Players of American football from Pennsylvania